Mian Yar Muhammad Kalhoro was the Nawab of Sindh. He rules from 1701 to 1719. The tomb of Mian Yar Muhammad is sited at one kilometer from Khudabad towards west. He was the leading pioneer for establishing firm and consistent rule of Kalhora clan in Sindh. Mian Yar Muhammad Kalhoro had constructed Jamia Mosque Khudabad.

Mian Yar Muhammad and Mian Deen Muhammad were sons of Mian Nasir Muhammad Kalhoro who was succeeded by his elder son Mian Deen Muhammad Kalhoro in 1692. Later, Mian Yar Muhammad Kalhoro became chieftain of Kalhora clan after his elder brother Mian Deen Muhammad Kalhoro who was imprisoned and killed in Multan jail by Prince Muiz-ud-Din Muhammad, the governor of Multan in 1700. He was founder of Kalhora dynasty in Sindh.

References 

Sindhi people
Kalhora dynasty